This is a list of number one singles on the Billboard Brasil Hot 100 chart in 2010. Billboard publishes a monthly chart.

Chart history

See also
Billboard Brasil
List of number-one pop hits of 2010 (Brazil)

Brazil
2010 Hot 100